Leyton is a district of east London.

Leyton may also refer to:

 Leyton (UK Parliament constituency)
 Leyton (ward), an electoral ward of the London Borough of Waltham Forest
 Municipal Borough of Leyton, a local government district in southwest Essex, England, from 1873 to 1965
 Leyton F.C., a football club in the district of Leyton
 Leyton High School, a public high school in Dalton, Nebraska, United States
 Leyton (surname)

See also

 Lleyton, a given name
 
 Layton (disambiguation)
 Leighton (disambiguation)